Relatively speaking, the brain consumes an immense amount of energy in comparison to the rest of the body. The mechanisms involved in the transfer of energy from foods to neurons are likely to be fundamental to the control of brain function. Human bodily processes, including the brain, all require both macronutrients, as well as micronutrients.

Insufficient intake of selected vitamins, or certain metabolic disorders, may affect cognitive processes by disrupting the nutrient-dependent processes within the body that are associated with the management of energy in neurons, which can subsequently affect synaptic plasticity, or the ability to encode new memories.

Macronutrients 
The human brain requires nutrients obtained from the diet to develop and sustain its physical structure and cognitive functions. Additionally, the brain requires caloric energy predominately derived from the primary macronutrients to operate. The three primary macronutrients include carbohydrates, proteins, and fats. Each macronutrient can impact cognition through multiple mechanisms, including glucose and insulin metabolism, neurotransmitter actions, oxidative stress and inflammation, and the gut-brain axis. Inadequate macronutrient consumption or proportion could impair optimal cognitive functioning and have long term health implications.

Carbohydrates 
Through digestion, dietary carbohydrates are broken down and converted into glucose, which is the sole energy source for the brain. Optimal brain function relies on adequate carbohydrate consumption, as carbohydrates provide the quickest source of glucose for the brain. Glucose deficiencies such as hypoglycaemia reduce available energy for the brain and impair all cognitive processes and performance. Additionally, situations with high cognitive demand, such as learning a new task, increase brain glucose utilization, depleting blood glucose stores and initiating the need for supplementation.

Complex carbohydrates, especially those with high dietary fibre, are associated with increased cognitive performance and improved memory function. This is because fibre regulates glucose metabolism, slowing the release of insulin and preserving insulin sensitivity. An improperly functioning glucose and insulin metabolism is a primary mechanism for cognitive impairment, and general metabolic dysfunction, as it can cause inflammation and oxidative stress within the brain, potentially leading to neurodegeneration. Therefore, complex carbohydrates with high fibre can improve glucose and insulin metabolism, which decreases inflammation and oxidative stress, and leads to improved brain aging as measured by the absence of disability, depression, chronic disease, and decreased cognitive decline.

Simple carbohydrates are associated with decreased global cognitive performance. Simple carbohydrates negatively impact many essential cognitive processes, including attention, memory, reaction time, visual-spatial processing, mental processing speed, and executive functions. Simple carbohydrates impair cognition through glucose and insulin metabolism dysfunction, as well as causing inflammation and oxidative stress within the brain. Therefore, excessive or chronic consumption of simple carbohydrates is unanimously linked to negative health consequences.

Proteins 
Through digestion dietary proteins are broken down into individual amino acids and absorbed into the blood. The essential amino acids tyrosine and tryptophan are precursors for the neurotransmitters dopamine, serotonin, and norepinephrine, and these chemicals modulate neural activity and influence cognitive functioning.

Dietary protein can improve cognition by increasing reaction time and inhibition control during mentally demanding and physically stressful situations, as tyrosine and tryptophan will replenish exhausted neurotransmitter levels. Additionally, adequate and consistent consumption of tyrosine and tryptophan correlates to improvements in memory function. Tyrosine is also shown to improve convergent thinking processes through increased cognitive control.

Insufficient and excessive protein consumption are both linked to decreased cognitive functioning and adverse health effects. Studies indicate long term protein overconsumption can increase inflammation and oxidative stress which impairs cognitive functioning. Excessive tyrosine consumption can also negatively impact short term working memory. Due to an interrelation between serotonin and melatonin high tryptophan levels can produce sedative effects, decreasing alertness and increasing sensations of fatigue.

Fats 
Through digestion dietary fats are broken down into individual fatty acids for utilization. Fatty acids are classified as saturated, trans, monounsaturated, polyunsaturated, and cholesterol. Each class has distinct affects on cognitive functioning and health.

Monounsaturated and polyunsaturated fatty acids are commonly found in avocados, vegetables, vegetable oils, olive oil, and fresh fish. These fatty acids are considered healthy and generally improve cognitive performance, executive function, memory performance, and promote long term brain health. This is achieved through a variety of mechanisms, including enhancing synaptic plasticity, promoting effective glucose utilization, and reducing inflammation and oxidative stress. Omega-3 polyunsaturated fatty acids are especially significant as they are critical cell membrane and structural components of the brain.

Cholesterol is an unsaturated alcohol commonly found in eggs, meat, and dairy. Studies on dietary cholesterol have indicated both positive and negative effects on global cognitive functioning. However, the adverse cognitive effects of cholesterol consumption appear to be reduced when combined with physical activity, which influences energy homeostasis and synaptic plasticity.

Saturated fatty acids are typically solid at room temperature with common sources including butter, cheese, and meat. Trans fatty acids occur naturally in some meat and dairy products, however the majority are artificially created by hydrogenating vegetable oils and are present in many processed foods. Saturated and trans fatty acids decrease cognitive functioning and specifically impact memory and learning performance. These fatty acids initiate an immediate inflammatory response which can cause oxidative stress, neurodegeneration, and a reduction of grey matter within the brain. Saturated and trans fatty acids are generally considered unhealthy for their universally adverse health implications.

Nutrients needed for memory development

Choline
Choline is an essential nutrient and its primary function within the human body is the synthesis of cellular membranes, although it serves other functions as well. It is a precursor molecule to the neurotransmitter Acetylcholine which serves a wide range of functions including motor control and memory. Choline deficiencies may be related to some liver and neurological disorders. Because of its role in cellular synthesis, choline is an important nutrient during the prenatal and early postnatal development of offspring as it contributes to brain development. Choline intakes from food for men, women and children may be below the Adequate Intake levels. Women, especially when pregnant or lactating, the elderly, and infants, are at risk for choline deficiency. Beef liver, wheat germ, and egg yolks are common foods providing choline.

Lutein and Zeaxanthin 
Lutein and zeaxanthin are carotenoids that contain very strong antioxidants.  Most of the research thus far has focused on the effect that these carotenoids have on vision and increased processing speeds of the eye.  In recent years, scientists have shifted their focus to their contribution to brain development and cognition due to newly found bio-accumulation of lutein and zeaxanthin in the brain. These nutrients can be found mostly in dark, leafy greens.  Some other foods include eggs, broccoli, zucchini, corn, and brussels sprouts. These foods should be raw or steamed in order to get the most nutrients out of them.

Omega 3 fatty acids 
Omega 3 fatty acids are essential for brain development and support cognition. These acids affect how the cell receptors react inside of the cell membranes. The human body is not able to make, or synthesize, omega 3 or DHA acids on its own.  This means that the only source we have for these vital fatty acids comes directly form the food that we eat. Many studies have shown that people who consume larger amounts of fish in their diet are less likely to suffer from depression.  Fish, especially salmon, have large amounts of omega 3 fatty acids and docosahexaonic acid (DHA).  In the last 100 years, the western civilizations have shown a significant decrease in DHA and omega 3 intake, and increase in saturated and trans fats. Comparatively, locations like the United States and Germany have dramatically more cases of major depression than locations like Japan, where their main food source comes from their fishing industry.

Foods for healthy brain development in children 
There are many foods that support healthy brain development.  Many experts recommend fitting some of the following foods into your everyday diet:

Salmon 
Salmon is very high in omega 3 acids and DHA.  There are other lean "white" fish meats, like albacore white tuna, that are a good source of protein but because they are more lean they are not high in fats.  Salmon salad sandwiches, instead of tuna salad, will provide both protein and omega 3 fatty acids.

Flax Seeds 
Aside from many other nutrients contained in flax seeds, just one tablespoon of flax seeds contains 1,597 mg of omega 3 fatty acids.

Blueberries and Strawberries 
Many dark, rich colored berries are shown to improve memory.

Peanuts/Nuts/Seeds 
Peanuts are a very good source of vitamin E which is an antioxidant.  They also contains thiamin that helps support the brain and nervous systems.  Nuts are also a very good source of protein for providing energy and increased concentration.

Whole Grains and Lean Beef 
Whole grains provide a lot of glucose and fiber.  The fiber from the grains helps to regulate the release of glucose into the body.  Glucose sugars are used by your body for energy.  Higher levels of energy are shown to improve concentration levels of the brain.  Lean beef is an excellent source of iron which is also shown to provide energy levels and increase concentration. a

Colorful Veggies 
These types of foods are rich with antioxidants needed to cleanse the blood stream and help to keep brain cells strong.

Milk/Yogurt/Dairy 
Dairy foods provide the body with Vitamins B and D.  Vitamin B is essential for brain tissue growth and also provides the body with enzymes.

Greens 
Leafy greens such as collard greens, spinach, cabbage, romaine lettuce, and kale are a good source of folate and very rich in vitamins.

B-Vitamin deficiencies and cognition
B vitamins, also known as the B-complex, are an interrelated group of nutrients which often co-occur in food. The complex consists of: thiamine (B1), riboflavin (B2), niacin (B3), pantothenic acid (B5), pyridoxin (B6), folic acid (B9), cobalamin (B12), and biotin. B vitamins are not synthesized in the body, and thus need to be obtained from food. B-complex vitamins are water-soluble vitamins, which means that they are not stored within the body. In consequence, the B vitamins need ongoing replenishment. It is possible to identify broad cognitive effects of certain B vitamins, as they are involved in many significant metabolic processes within the brain.

In a study done by a group of researchers in 2012, vitamin levels were measured in the subjects' blood and compared to the results from memory tests that they were given. The study showed that people with higher vitamin levels, mainly Vitamin B, had higher scores on their memory tests. The study was conducted at the Oregon Health & Science University and although it may still need official confirmation, there is sufficient evidence to support the fact that improving your diet can significantly increase the sharpness of your brain.

Vitamin B1 (thiamine)
This vitamin is important for the facilitation of glucose use, thus ensuring the production of energy for the brain, and normal functioning of the nervous system, muscles and heart. Thiamine is found throughout mammalian nervous tissue, including the brain and spinal cord. Metabolism and coenzyme function of the vitamin suggest a distinctive function for thiamine within the nervous system. The brain retains its thiamine content in the face of a vitamin-deficient diet with great tenacity, as it is the last of all nervous tissues studied to become depleted.

Lack of thiamin causes the disease known as beriberi. There are two forms of beriberi: "wet", and "dry". Dry beriberi is also known as cerebral beriberi and characterized by peripheral neuropathy. Thiamine deficiency has been reported in up to 80% of people who are alcoholic due to inadequate nutritional intake, reduced absorption, and impaired utilization of thiamine. Clinical signs of B1 deficiency include mental changes such as apathy, decrease in short-term memory, confusion, and irritability; also increased rates of depression, dementia, falls, and fractures in old age.

The lingering symptoms of neuropathy associated with cerebral beriberi are known as Korsakoff's syndrome, or the chronic phase of Wernicke-Korsakoff's. Wernicke encephalopathy is characterized by ocular abnormalities, ataxia of gait, a global state of confusion, and neuropathy. The state of confusion associated with Wernicke's may consist of apathy, inattention, spatial disorientation, inability to concentrate, and mental sluggishness or restlessness. Clinical diagnosis of Wernicke's disease cannot be made without evidence of ocular disturbance, yet these criteria may be too rigid. Korsakoff's syndrome likely represents a variation in the clinical manifestation of Wernicke encephalopathy, as they both share similar pathological origin. It is often characterized by confabulation, disorientation, and profound amnesia. Characteristics of the neuropathology are varied, but generally consist of bilaterally symmetrical midline lesions of brainstem areas, including the mammillary bodies, thalamus, periaqueductal region, hypothalamus, and the cerebellar vermis. Immediate treatment of Wernicke encephalopathy involves the administration of intravenous thiamine, followed with long-term treatment and prevention of the disorder through oral thiamine supplements, alcohol abstinence, and a balanced diet. Improvements in brain functioning of chronic alcoholics may occur with abstinence-related treatment, involving the discontinuation of alcohol consumption and improved nutrition.

Vitamin B3 (niacin)
Vitamin B3, also known as niacin, includes both nicotinamide as well as nicotinic acid, both of which function in many biological oxidization and reduction reactions within the body. Niacin is involved in the synthesis of fatty acids and cholesterol, known mediators of brain biochemistry, and in effect, of cognitive function. Pellagra is a niacin deficiency disease. Pellagra is classically characterized by four 4 "D's": diarrhea, dermatitis, dementia, and death. Neuropsychiatric manifestations of pellagra include headache, irritability, poor concentration, anxiety, hallucinations, stupor, apathy, psychomotor unrest, photophobia, tremor, ataxia, spastic paresis, fatigue, and depression. Symptoms of fatigue and insomnia may progress to encephalopathy characterized by confusion, memory loss, and psychosis. Those afflicted with pellagra may undergo pathological alterations in the nervous system. Findings may include demylenation and degeneration of various affected parts of the brain, spinal cord, and peripheral nerves.

Oral nicotinamide has been promoted as an over-the-counter drug for the treatment of Alzheimer's dementia. Conversely, no clinically significant effect has been found for the drug, as nicotinamide administration has not been found to promote memory functions in people with mild to moderate dementia of either Alzheimers', vascular, or fronto-temporal types. This evidence suggests that nicotinamide may treat dementia as related to pellagra, but administration does not effectively treat other types of dementia. Though treatment with niacin does little to alter the effects of Alzheimer's dementia, niacin intake from foods is inversely associated with the disease.

Vitamin B9 (folic acid)
Folate and vitamin B12 play a vital role in the synthesis of S-adenosylmethionine, which is of key importance in the maintenance and repair of all cells, including neurons. In addition, folate has been linked to the maintenance of adequate brain levels of cofactors necessary for chemicals reactions that lead to the synthesis of serotonin and catecholamine neurotransmitters. Concentrations of blood plasma folate and homocysteine concentrations are inversely related, such that an increase in dietary folate decreases homocysteine concentration. Thus, dietary intake of folate is a major determinant of homocysteine levels within the body. The relationship between folate and B12 is so interdependent that deficiency in either vitamin can result in megaloblastic anemia, characterized by organic mental change.

The link between levels of folate and altered mental function is not large, but is sufficient enough to suggest a causal association. Deficiency in folate can cause an elevation of homocysteine within the blood, as the clearance of homocysteine requires enzymatic action dependent on folate, and to a lesser extent, vitamins B6 and B12. Elevated homocysteine has been associated with increased risk of vascular events, as well as dementia.

Differences lie in the presentation of megaloblastic anemia induced by either folate or B12 deficiency. Megaloblastic anemia related to deficiency in B12 generally results in peripheral neuropathy, whereas folate-related anemia often results in affective, or mood disorders. Neurological effects are not often associated with folate-related megaloblastic anemia, although demyelinating disorders may eventually present. In one study, mood disturbances were recorded for the majority of people with megaloblastic anemia in the absence of B12 deficiency. In addition, folate concentrations within blood plasma have been found to be lower in people with both unipolar and bipolar depressive disorders when compared with control groups. In addition, depressive groups with low folate concentrations responded less well to standard antidepressant therapy than did those with normal levels within plasma. However, replication of these findings are less robust.

Intake of the vitamin has been linked to deficits in learning and memory, particularly within the elderly population. Elderly people deficient in folate may present with deficits in free recall and recognition, which suggests that levels of folate may be related to efficacy of episodic memory. Lack of adequate folate may produce a form of dementia considered to be reversible with administration of the vitamin. Indeed, there is a degree of improvement in memory associated with folate treatment. In a 3-year longitudinal study of men and women aged 50–70 years with elevated homocysteine plasma concentration, researchers found that a daily oral folic acid supplementation of 800μg resulted in an increase in folate levels and a decrease in homocysteine levels within blood plasma. In addition to these results, improvements of memory, and information-processing speed, as well as slight improvements of sensorimotor speed were observed, which suggests there is a link between homocysteine and cognitive performance. However, while the amount of cognitive improvement after treatment with folate is correlated with the severity of folate deficiency, the severity of cognitive decline is independent of the severity of folate deficiency. This suggests that the dementia observed may not be entirely related to levels folate, as there could be additional factors that were not accounted for which might have an effect.

Because neurulation may be completed before pregnancy is recognized, it is recommended that women capable of becoming pregnant take about 400μg of folic acid from fortified foods, supplements, or a combination of the two in order to reduce the risk of neural tube defects. These major anomalies in the nervous system can be reduced by 85% with systematic folate supplementation occurring before the onset of pregnancy. The incidence of Alzheimer's and other cognitive diseases has been loosely connected to deficiencies in folate. It is recommended for the elderly to consume folate through food, fortified or not, and supplements in order to reduce risk of developing the disease.

Additionally, folic acid has also been found to improve the memory of older people. There is some evidence that deficiency in folic acid may increase the risk of dementia, especially Alzheimer's disease and vascular dementia, but there is debate about whether it lowers risk of cognitive impairment in the older population. Folic acid supplementation is shown to lower blood homocysteine levels, while folic acid deficiency can lead to a condition of high levels of homocysteine (Hcy) in the bloodstream called hyperhomocysteinemia (HHcy). HHcy is related to several vascular diseases such as coronary artery disease, peripheral vascular disease, and stroke.

Vitamin B12 (cobalamin)
Also known as cobalamin, B12 is important for the maintenance of neurological function and psychiatric health. B12 deficiency, also known as hypocobalaminemia, often results from complications involving absorption into the body. An assortment of neurological effects can be observed in 75–90% of individuals of any age with clinically observable B12 deficiency. Cobalamin deficiency manifestations are apparent in the abnormalities of the spinal cord, peripheral nerves, optic nerves, and cerebrum. These abnormalities involve a progressive degeneration of myelin, and may be expressed behaviorally through reports of sensory disturbances in the extremities, or motor disturbances, such as gait ataxia. Combined myelopathy and neuropathy are prevalent within a large percentage of cases. Cognitive changes may range from loss of concentration to memory loss, disorientation, and dementia. All of these symptoms may present with or without additional mood changes. Mental symptoms are extremely variable, and include mild disorders of mood, mental slowness, and memory defect. Memory defect encompasses symptoms of confusion, severe agitation and depression, delusions and paranoid behavior, visual and auditory hallucinations, dysphasia, violent maniacal behavior and epilepsy. It has been suggested that mental symptoms could be related to a decrease in cerebral metabolism, as caused by the state of deficiency.

Mild to moderate cases of pernicious anemia may show poor concentration. In severe cases of pernicious anemia, individuals may present with various cognitive problems such as dementia, and memory loss. It is not always easy to determine whether B12 deficiency is present, especially within older adults. People may present with violent behavior or more subtle personality changes. They may also present with vague complaints, such as fatigue or memory loss, that may be attributed to normative aging processes. Cognitive symptoms may mimic behavior in Alzheimer's and other dementias as well.

People who are deficient in B12 despite normal absorption functionality may be treated through oral administration of at least 6 µg/day of the vitamin in pill form. People who suffer from irreversible causes of deficiency, such as pernicious anemia or old age, will need lifelong treatment with pharmacological doses of B12. Strategy for treatment is dependent on the person's level of deficiency as well as their level of cognitive functioning. Treatment for those with severe deficiency involves 1000 µg of B12 administered intramuscularly daily for one week, weekly for one month, then monthly for the rest of the person's life. The progression of neurological manifestations of cobalamin deficiency is generally gradual. As a result, early diagnosis is important or else irreversible damage may occur. People who become demented usually show little to no cognitive improvement with the administration of B12. There is risk that folic acid administered to those with B12 deficiency may mask anemic symptoms without solving the issue at hand. In this case, people would still be at risk for neurological deficits associated with B12 deficiency-related anemia, which are not associated with anemia related to folate deficiency.

Vitamin A deficiency and impaired memory
Vitamin A is an essential nutrient for mammals which takes form in either retinol or the provitamin beta-Carotene. It helps regulation of cell division, cell function, genetic regulation, helps enhance the immune system, and is required for brain function, chemical balance, growth and development of the central nervous system and vision.

Iron deficiency and cognition
Oxygen transportation, DNA synthesis, myelin synthesis, oxidative phosphorylation, and neurotransmitter synthesis and metabolism are all biological processes that require iron; however, an iron imbalance can result in neurotoxicity causing oxidation and modification of lipids, proteins, carbohydrates, and DNA. Hypoxic conditions in severely anemic individuals may cause brain damage resulting in cognitive impairment. When iron levels in the brain are disrupted neurophysiological mechanisms and cognition are affected, potentially resulting in long-term behavioral changes and may affect attention span, intelligence, sensory perception functions, mood, and behavior.  Neuropathies such as ADHD, autism, depression, anxiety, schizophrenia, and bipolar disorder are seen in iron deficient individuals. However, excessive iron accumulation can be seen in neurodegenerative diseases including Alzheimer’s and Huntington’s disease. Iron is needed to develop the central nervous system (CNS), endocrine system, autoimmune system, and brain. Iron is involved with the development and functioning of different neurotransmitter systems and large iron quantities are required for the myelination of white brain matter. Abnormal myelination of white matter due to iron deficiency during development may be related to the onset of psychological disorders in adolescents. Decreased iron concentration results in a reduction of neurotransmitter levels, in turn leading to poor myelination and delayed neuromaturation.

Aging and cognitive disease
Foods that are rich in omega-3 fatty acids have been shown to decrease risk of getting Alzheimer's disease.

Omega-3 fatty acids 
Omega-3 fatty acids, primarily docosahexaenoic acid (DHA), which is the most prevalent omega-3 fatty acid found in neurons, have been studied extensively for use in possible prevention and therapy of Alzheimer's disease. Some studies (cross-sectional) suggest that reduced intake or low brain levels of DHA are associated with earlier development of cognitive deficits or development of dementia, including Alzheimer's disease. Several clinical trials suggest that omega-3 fatty acid supplementation does not have significant effects in the treatment of Alzheimer's disease—which in turn may suggest that the protective benefits of omega-3 fatty acid supplementation could depend on the scope of the disease and other confounding factors.  A diet that is rich in antioxidants will also help get rid of free radicals in the body, which could be a cause for Alzheimer's. The buildup of Beta Amyloid plaques, a marker highly associated with Alzheimer's disease, generates cell damaging free radicals. Therefore, the role of antioxidants as protectants against Alzheimer's disease has become a hot topic of study. Simple dietary modification, towards fewer highly processed carbohydrates and relatively more fats ad cholesterol, is likely a protective measure against Alzheimer's disease.

See also 
Nootropic
Nutrition
Nutritional neuroscience
Pellagra
Wernicke–Korsakoff syndrome

References 

Nutrition
Cognition
Memory